Dairymaster is an Irish manufacturer of dairy machinery headquartered in Causeway, County Kerry.

Dairy products companies of Ireland
Irish companies established in 1968
Manufacturing companies established in 1968
Buildings and structures in County Kerry
Manufacturing companies of the Republic of Ireland